Sbaa is a town and commune in Tsabit District, Adrar Province, south-central Algeria. According to the 2008 census it has a population of 2,312, up from 1,989 in 1998, with an annual growth rate of 1.5%, making it the least populated commune in the province.

Geography

The town of Sbaa and the nearby village of El Guerara lie at the very southern end of the Gourara region, an area in northern Adrar Province with many scattered oases. The town itself lies on the eastern and north-eastern sides of a small oasis.

Climate

Sbaa has a hot desert climate (Köppen climate classification BWh), with extremely hot summers and mild winters, and very little precipitation throughout the year.

Transportation

Sbaa lies on the N6 national highway along with the village of El Guerara  to the south. The N6 highway leads north to Béchar and south to Adrar.

Education

2.4% of the population has a tertiary education, and another 15.8% has completed secondary education. The overall literacy rate is 78.8%, and is 85.5% among males and 71.4% among females.

Localities
As of 1984, the commune was composed of three localities:

Sbaa
Village socialiste
El Guerara

References 

Neighbouring towns and cities

Communes of Adrar Province
Cities in Algeria
Algeria